Kydonia Province was one of the province of Chania Prefecture, Crete, Greece. Its territory corresponded with that of the current municipalities Chania and Platanias, except the municipal units Kolymvari and Voukolies (partly). It was abolished in 2006.

References

Chania (regional unit)
Provinces of Greece